Elsevier BIOBASE is a bibliographic database covering all topics pertaining to biological research throughout the world. It was established in the 1950s in print format as Current Awareness in Biological Sciences. Temporal coverage is from 1994 to the present. The database has over 4.1 million records as of December 2008. More than 300,000 records are added annually and 84% contain an abstract. It is updated weekly.

Coverage 
Coverage of the biological sciences is derived from 1,900 journals. Subjects are indexed by titles, authors, abstracts, bibliographic details and authors' addresses. This database covers the following disciplines:

Access points
Access points on the internet are DataStar, DIALOG, DIMDI, and STN.

Former titles 
This database continues: 
 
International Abstracts of Biological Sciences

It also continues in part: 

Current Advances in Neuroscience 
Current Advances in Cell & Developmental Biology

References

External links 
 

Biological databases
Microbiology literature
Biotechnology databases
Ecological data
Environmental science databases
Internet properties established in 1994
1954 establishments